Nature writing is nonfiction or fiction prose or poetry about the natural environment. Nature writing encompasses a wide variety of works, ranging from those that place primary emphasis on natural history facts (such as field guides) to those in which philosophical interpretation predominate. It includes natural history essays, poetry, essays of solitude or escape, as well as travel and adventure writing.

Nature writing often draws heavily on scientific information and facts about the natural world; at the same time, it is frequently written in the first person and incorporates personal observations of and philosophical reflections upon nature.

Modern nature writing traces its roots to the works of natural history that were popular in the second half of the 18th century and throughout the 19th. An important early figure was the "parson-naturalist" Gilbert White (1720–1793), a pioneering English naturalist and ornithologist. He is best known for his Natural History and Antiquities of Selborne (1789).

William Bartram (1739–1823) is a significant early American pioneer naturalist who first work was published in 1791.

Pioneers
Gilbert White is regarded by many as England's first ecologist, and one of those who shaped the modern attitude of respect for nature. He said of the earthworm: "Earthworms, though in appearance a small and despicable link in the chain of nature, yet, if lost, would make a lamentable chasm. [...] worms seem to be the great promoters of vegetation, which would proceed but lamely without them" White and William Markwick collected records of the dates of emergence of more than 400 plant and animal species in Hampshire and Sussex between 1768 and 1793, which was summarised in The Natural History and Antiquities of Selborne, as the earliest and latest dates for each event over the 25-year period, are among the earliest examples of modern phenology.

The tradition of clerical naturalists predates White and can be traced back to some monastic writings of the Middle Ages, although some argue that their writings about animals and plants cannot be correctly classified as natural history. Notable early parson-naturalists were William Turner (1508–1568), John Ray (1627–1705), William Derham (1657–1735).

William Bartram, in the late 1700s, travelled extensively in the Americas, making drawings and notes on the native flora, fauna and native American Indians; his work, now known as Bartram's Travels, was published in 1791. Ephraim George Squier and Edwin Hamilton Davis, in their book, Ancient Monuments of the Mississippi Valley, name Bartram as "the first naturalist who penetrated the dense tropical forests of Florida."

After Gilbert White and William Bartram, other significant writers include American ornithologist John James Audubon (1785–1851), Charles Darwin (1809–1882) and Alfred Russel Wallace (1823–1913). Other founders of modern nature writing include Englishman Richard Jefferies (1848-1887) and Americans Susan Fenimore Cooper (1813–1894) and Henry David Thoreau (1817–1862). Other significant writers included Ralph Waldo Emerson (1803–1882), John Burroughs (1837–1931) and John Muir (1838–1914).

An important early illustrated work was A History of British Birds  by Thomas Bewick, published in two volumes. Volume 1, "Land Birds", appeared in 1797. Volume 2, "Water Birds", appeared in 1804.  The book was effectively the first "field guide" for non-specialists. Bewick provides an accurate illustration of each species, from life if possible, or from skins. The common and scientific name(s) are listed, citing the naming authorities. The bird is described, with its distribution and behaviour, often with extensive quotations from printed sources or correspondents. Critics note Bewick's skill as a naturalist as well as an engraver.

In the late 19th to mid-20th century, essayist E. V. Lucas (1868–1938) wrote prolifically, including much observation of the natural world.

20th century to date
The 20th century, particularly the second half, saw a dramatic increase in nature writing in fiction and non-fiction. One of the earlier of these was John Moore (1907–1967), a best-selling pioneer conservationist. Writing from the 1930s to 1960s, he was described by Sir Compton Mackenzie as the most talented writer about the countryside of his generation. Moore's contemporaries included Henry Williamson (1895–1977), best known for Tarka the Otter, whose imaginative prose won Williamson the Hawthornden Prize in 1928. Other 20th century writers included Aldo Leopold (1887–1948), M. Krishnan (1912–1996), and Edward Abbey (1927–1989) (although he rejected the term for himself).

After World War II, other writers emerged, including teacher and naturalist Margaret Hutchinson (1904–1997), a strong advocate for raising children as naturalists from an early age, while some heralded a new and pointed style carrying stronger warnings of environmental loss, such as Rachel Carson (1907–1964), best known for Silent Spring, published in 1962.

Some important contemporary figures in Britain include Richard Mabey, Roger Deakin, Mark Cocker, and Oliver Rackham. Rackham's books included Ancient Woodland (1980) and The History of the Countryside (1986). Richard Mabey has been involved with radio and television programmes on nature, and his book Nature Cure, describes his experiences and recovery from depression in the context of man's relationship with landscape and nature. He has also edited and introduced editions of Richard Jefferies, Gilbert White, Flora Thompson and Peter Matthiessen. Mark Cocker has written extensively for British newspapers and magazines and his books include Birds Britannica (with Richard Mabey) (2005). and Crow Country (2007). He frequently writes about modern responses to the wild, whether found in landscape, human societies or in other species. Roger Deakin was an English writer, documentary-maker and environmentalist. In 1999, Deakin's acclaimed book Waterlog was published. Inspired in part by the short story The Swimmer by John Cheever, it describes his experiences of 'wild swimming' in Britain's rivers and lakes and advocates open access to the countryside and waterways.  Deakin's book Wildwood appeared posthumously in 2007. It describes a series of journeys across the globe that Deakin made to meet people whose lives are intimately connected to trees and wood. In 2016, Peter Wohllebens book The Hidden Life of Trees: What They Feel, How They Communicate, was translated from German into English and became a New York Times Bestseller.

In 2017 the German book publishing company Matthes & Seitz Berlin started to grant the German Award for Nature Writing, an annual literary award for writers in German language that excellently fulfil the criteria of the literary genre. It came with a prize money of 10,000 euro and additionally an artist in residency grant of six weeks at the International Academy for Nature Conservation of Germany on the German island Vilm. The British Council in 2018 offered an education bursary and workshops to six young German authors dedicated to nature writing.

See also
 Ecofiction
 List of environmental books
 Nature
 Natural history
 Outdoor literature

References

Further reading
 Finch, Robert, and John Elder, eds. The Norton Book of Nature Writing. New York: Norton, 1990; Nature writing: the tradition in English. edited by Robert Finch and John Elder. New York: W.W. Norton, c2002. This book is an all encompassing guide and encyclopedia of 200 years of nature writing. 
 Keith,  W. J., The Rural Tradition: William Cobbett, Gilbert White, and Other Non-Fiction Writers of the English Countryside. Hassocks, Sussex: Harvester, 1975. This book has a useful bibliography. In addition, this book goes over specific parts of nature writing, including landscape, pastoral and country life literature. 
 Lyon, Thomas J., ed. This Incomparable Land: A Book of American Nature Writing. Boston: Houghton Mifflin, 1989. This book is an introduction guide to the genre. It goes over the vastness of the genre and American writing within the genre. 
  This textbook styled book mainly consists of the history behind nature writing. 
 Mabey, Richard, The Oxford Book of Nature Writing. Oxford: Oxford University Press, 1995. This piece also goes over the magnitude of this genre and presents essays from varying nature authors. 
 Stewart, Frank, A Natural History of Nature Writing. Washington, D.C.: Island Press, 1994. This books concentrates on the origins of American nature writing. 
 Trimble, Stephen, "Words From the Land: Encounters with Natural History Writing". Reno: University of Nevada Press, 1995 (revised edition). . This book is a representative collection of essays which goes over the contemporary part of nature writing.

External links
 William Bartram's early Southern travels (archived 25 July 2011)
 Audubon's Birds of America at the U. of Pittsburgh
 
Land Lines: British Nature Writing, 1789–2014 (AHRC funded research project exploring British nature writing from the late eighteenth century to the present).

Genres
Non-fiction literature
Natural history
Science writing

Environmental humanities
Nature writers